Geraldo José da Silva (6 March 1936 – 21 April 2013) was a Brazilian footballer. He played in five matches for the Brazil national football team in 1959. He was also part of Brazil's squad for the 1959 South American Championship that took place in Ecuador.

References

External links
 

1936 births
2013 deaths
Brazilian footballers
Brazil international footballers
Association football forwards
Sportspeople from Recife